Henry Hulm Lever (5 January 1886 – 19 July 1970) was an Australian rules footballer who played with St Kilda in the Victorian Football League (VFL).

Lever played as a fullback in his 15-year VFL career which began in 1905. In 1907, he lost two fingers in a band saw accident, but after attending to the wound himself, played for St Kilda the following afternoon.

He did not play in 1916 or 1917 as St Kilda were in recess due to World War I, while he missed 1920 as he was injured in the pre-season.

Lever was captain of St Kilda's 1913 VFL Grand Final team.

He was the first St Kilda player to play 200 games, with his 218 games for St Kilda remaining the club record until it was broken by Ross Smith in Round 21 of 1972.

References

External links 

 
 

1886 births
1970 deaths
Australian rules footballers from Victoria (Australia)
Australian Rules footballers: place kick exponents
St Kilda Football Club players
Australian rules footballers from Sydney
People from Parramatta